Brazil competed at the 2011 Pan American Games in Guadalajara, Mexico from October 14 to 30, 2011. Bernard Rajzman will be the Chef de mission. Brazil's team consisted of 521 athletes in 32 sports.

Medalists

Archery

Brazil has qualified a full men's and women's team of three athletes each.

Men

Women

Athletics

Men

Track and road events

*-Indicates athletes that participated in the preliminaries but not the finals

Field events

Combined events

Women

Track and road events

Field events

Combined events

Badminton

Brazil has qualified four male and female athletes in the individual and team competitions.

Men

Women

Mixed

Basketball

Brazil has qualified the men's and women's team to the basketball competition.

Men

Lucas Alves
Victor Benite
Murilo Da Rosa
Davi De Oliveira
Jose Roberto Duarte
Cristiano Felicio
Guilherme Giovannoni
Guilherme Hubner
Bruno Irigoyen
Marcelo Machado
Wellington Santos
Arthur Luiz Silva

Group B

Fifth place match

Women

Tassia Carcavalli
Damiris Dantas
Izabela De Andrade
Barbara de Queiroz
Carina De Souza
Érika de Souza
Clarissa Dos Santos
Gilmara Justino
Palmira Marcal
Iziane Marques
Jacqueline Silvestre
Silvia Valiente

Group B

Semifinals

Bronze medal match

Beach volleyball

Brazil has qualified a men's pair and women's pair in the beach volleyball competition.

Bowling

Brazil has qualified two male and two female bowlers to compete in the singles and pairs competitions.

Men

Individual

Pairs

Women
Individual

Pairs

Boxing

Brazil has qualified seven male boxers in the 52 kg, 56 kg, 60 kg, 64 kg, 69 kg, 75 kg, and 81 kg men's categories and two female boxers in the 60 kg and 75 kg women's categories.

Men

Women

Canoeing

Brazil has qualified a total of eight boats in six men's and two women's competitions.

Men

Women

Cycling

Road cycling

Men

Women

Track cycling
Brazil has qualified 9 athletes, 5 male and 4 female, to compete in the BMX competition.

Sprints and pursuit

Keirin

Omnium

Mountain biking
Brazil has qualified 3 athletes, 2 male and 1 female, to compete in the BMX competition.

Men

Women

BMX
Brazil has qualified four athletes, two male and two female, to compete in the BMX competition.

Diving

Men

Women

Equestrian

Dressage

Eventing

Individual jumping

Team jumping

Fencing

Brazil has qualified men's and women's athletes in the foil and sabre competitions and women's athletes in the épée competition.

Men

Women

Football

Brazil has qualified a men's and women's team in the football competition.

Men

Felipe Amorim
Lucas Benetao
Misael Bueno
Sebastião Couto Junior
Romário De Moura
Rafael De Souza
Luccas Dos Santos
Madson Dos Santos
Cesar Dutra
Alcides Farias Junior
Djair Francisco Junior
Felipe Anderson Gomes
Lucas Goncalves
Weverson Moura
Henrique Nascentes
Douglas Pires
Henrique Ribeiro
Rodrigo Santos

Men's team will participate in Group B of the football tournament.

Women

Francielle Alberto
Rosana Augusto
Barbara Barbosa
Daniele Batista
Renata Costa
Debora De Oliveira
Maurine Goncalves
Thais Guedes
Beatriz Joao
Miraildes Mota
Grazielle Nascimento
Tania Pereira
Thais Picarte
Karen Rocha
Daiane Rodrigues
Andreia Santos
Renata Santos
Ketlen Wiggers

The women's team will participate in Group B of the football tournament.

Semifinals

Gold medal match

Gymnastics

Artistic
Brazil has qualified six male and six female athletes in the artistic gymnastics competition.

Men

Individual qualification & Team Finals

Individual Finals

Women

Individual qualification & Team Finals

Individual Finals

Rhythmic
Brazil has qualified two individual athletes and one team in the rhythmic gymnastics competition.

Individual

Group

Trampoline
Brazil has qualified two male and two female athletes in the trampoline gymnastics competition.

Men

Women

Handball

Brazil has qualified the men's and women's teams to the handball competitions.

Men

Leonardo Bortoloni
Gustavo Cardoso
Fabio Chiuffa
Bruno De Santana
Marcos Paulo Dos Santos
Thiagus Dos Santos
Jaqson Kojoroski
Fernando Pacheco Filho
Gil Pires
Felipe Ribeiro
Renato Ruy
Maik Santos
Ales Silva
Henrique Texeira
Vinicius Texeira

Group A

Semifinals

Gold medal match

Women

Eduarda Amorim
Bárbara Arenhart
Moniki Bancilon
Francine Cararo
Deonise Cavaleiro
Fernanda da Silva
Fabiana Diniz
Alexandra do Nascimento
Mayara Moura
Daniela Piedade
Silvia Pinheiro
Jéssica Quintino
Samira Rocha
Ana Paula Rodrigues
Chana Masson

Group B

Semifinals

Gold medal match

Judo

Brazil has qualified athletes in all categories of competition.

Men

Women

Repechage Rounds

Karate

Brazil has qualified three male athletes in the 60 kg, 84 kg, and 84+kg categories and three female athletes in the 50 kg, 55 kg, and 68 kg categories.

Modern pentathlon

Brazil has qualified two male and two female pentathletes.

Men

Women

Roller skating

Men

Artistic

Women

Artistic

Rowing

Men

Women

Rugby sevens

Brazil has qualified a team to participate in rugby sevens. It will consist of 12 athletes.

Team

Erik Cogliardo
Joao Luiz Da Roz
Rafael Dawalibi
Lucas Duque
Moisés Duque
Daniel Gregg
Diego Lopes
Henrique Pinto
Fernando Portugal
Diogo Santos
Felipe Silva
Jefferson Silva

Quarterfinals

Fifth to eighth place

Seventh place match

Sailing

Brazil has qualified boats in all categories.

Men

Women

Open

Shooting

Men

Women

Squash

Brazil has qualified three male and three female athletes in the individual and team competitions.

Men

Women

Swimming

Brazil has qualified twenty male and twenty-two female athletes in the individual and team competitions.

Men

Women

* Swimmers who participated in the heats only and received medals.

Synchronized swimming

Brazil has qualified a team and a duet to participate.

Table tennis

Brazil has qualified three male and three female athletes to compete in the individual and team competitions.

Men

Women

Taekwondo

Brazil has qualified three male athletes in the 58 kg, 68 kg, and 80 kg categories and three female athletes in the 49 kg, 67 kg

Men

Women

Tennis

Men

Women

Mixed doubles

Triathlon

Brazil has qualified a full triathlon team.

Men

Women

Volleyball

Brazil has qualified a men's and women's team to the volleyball competition.

Men

Squad

Thiago Alves
Mauricio Borges
Eder Carbonera
Mario Da Silva
Mauricio De Souza
Wallace De Souza
Gustavo Endres
Luiz Fonteles
Wallace Martins
Murilo Radke
Bruno Rezende
Renato Russomanno

Semifinals

Gold medal match

Women

Squad

Fabiana Claudino
Juciely Silva
Dani Lins
Paula Pequeno
Thaísa Menezes
Marianne Steinbrecher
Jaqueline Carvalho
Tandara Caixeta
Sheilla Castro
Fabiana de Oliveira
Fernanda Garay
Fabíola de Souza

Semifinals

Gold medal match

Water polo

Brazil has qualified the men's and women's teams to the water polo competition.

Men

Team

Henrique Carvalho
João Coelho
Danilo Correa
Jonas Crivella
Marcelo Das Chagas
Felipe De Costa
Luís Dos Santos
Marcelo Franco
Ruda Franco
Gustavo Guimăres
Bernardo Rocha
Gabriel Rocha
Emilio Vieira

The men's team will compete in Group B.

Semifinals

Bronze medal match

Women

Team

Tess De Oliveira
Cecilia Canetti
Marina Zablith
Marina Canetti
Catherine De Oliveira
Izabella Chiappini
Cristina Beer
Luiza Carvalho
Fernanda Lissoni
Gabriela Gozani
Mirela Coutinho
Gabriela Dias
Manuela Canetti

The women's team will compete in Group A.

Semifinals

Bronze medal match

Water skiing

Brazil has qualified a full team in the water skiing competition.

Men

Women

Weightlifting

Brazil has qualified two male and two female weightlifters.

Wrestling

Brazil has qualified two wrestlers in the 84 kg and 120 kg men's freestyle categories, three wrestlers in the 55 kg, 60 kg, and 84 kg men's Greco-Roman categories, and two wrestlers in the 55 kg and 72 kg women's freestyle categories.

Men
Freestyle

Greco-Roman

Women
Freestyle

References

Nations at the 2011 Pan American Games
P
2011